Webmention is a W3C recommendation that describes a simple protocol to notify any URL when a website links to it, and for web pages to request notifications when somebody links to them. Webmention was originally developed in the IndieWebCamp community and published as a W3C working draft on January 12, 2016. As of January 12, 2017 it is a W3C recommendation. Webmention enables authors to keep track of who is linking to, referring to, or commenting on their articles. By incorporating such comments from other sites, sites themselves provide federated commenting functionality.

Similar to pingback, Webmention is one of four types of linkbacks, but was designed to be simpler than the XML-RPC protocol that pingback relies upon, by instead only using HTTP and x-www-urlencoded content. Beyond previous linkback protocols, Webmention also specifies protocol details for when a page that is the source of a link is deleted, or updated with new links or removal of existing links.

See also
 Pingback, the XML-RPC based protocol that Webmention was modeled after.
 Refback, a similar protocol but easier than Pingbacks since the site originating the link doesn't have to be capable of sending a Pingback request.
 Trackback, a similar protocol but more prone to Sping (Trackback spam) since there is no authentication or verification possible with Trackbacks.

References

World Wide Web Consortium standards
Blogs